Kokhav Ya'ir–Tzur Yig'al (also Kochav Yair–Tzur Yigal) is a town (local council) in the Central District of Israel. Kokhav Ya'ir and the neighboring town of Tzur Yig'al merged in November 2003.

History
Kokhav Ya'ir was established in 1981 by 15 families living in temporary quarters. Two years later, work began on infrastructure for a permanent town. In 1986, 550 families moved into permanent housing and the town was officially founded. Tzur Yig'al was founded in 1991, with the first families moving into permanent homes in the summer of 1994.

Kokhav Ya'ir (literally "Ya'ir's star") was named for Avraham Stern, who went by the alias Ya'ir. He was the founder and leader of the Lehi group, a militant Jewish underground active during the British Mandate of Palestine. Stern is also German for "star." Tzur Yig'al (literally "Yig'al's rock") was named for Israeli Knesset member Yigal Cohen.

Demography
Kokhav Ya'ir is exclusively Jewish, with a high income level. Kokhav Yair is a secular community with a religious minority. Religious tensions are virtually non-existent. Residents from English speaking countries comprise approximately 20% of the population.

Geography

The Sapir Lookout in Kokhav Ya'ir attracts bird watchers who come to observe the semi-annual migration of many species of birds.

Education and sports
Kokhav Ya'ir currently has four schools, two secular elementary schools ('Keshet' and 'Nof Tzurim'), one religious elementary school ('Dekel') and one middle school ('Ramon', named after the Astronaut Ilan Ramon). After finishing middle school students are usually directed to highschools in Ra'anana and Kfar Saba and Herzliya.

Kokhav Ya'ir's local basketball team, Elitzur Kokhav Ya'ir, has been a member of the Israel National Basketball League since 2008.

Kokhav Ya'ir's country club from 2010 to 2017 refused membership to “Israeli Arabs”. After a petition from Tira, an Arab village nearby, the club decided to “sanitize” its racist policy by restricting membership to Kochav Yair–Tzur Yig'al's residents. A member of the local council said: “What drives people from the club isn’t the price, but the Arabs. We came to live in a community. Whether we’re racist or not, it doesn’t matter. The fact is that residents are leaving the community center because of the Arab children. It’s not clear why we can’t express our opinion.” The club is partially funded by the Israeli government.

Notable residents
Ehud Barak
Shaul Mofaz
Michael Eitan
Shlomi Haimy, Olympic mountain cyclist specializing in cross-country cycling
Dani Yatom
Gideon Ezra
Michael Ratzon
Uzi Dayan
Nino Abesadze
Dov Elbaum
Omer Bar-Lev

References

External links
Kochav Ya'ir's municipality site 

Local councils in Central District (Israel)
1986 establishments in Israel
Populated places established in 1986